Şäpşe is a rural locality (a selo) in Biektaw District, Tatarstan. The population was 1268 as of 2010.

 is located 14 km east of Biektaw, district's administrative centre, and 40 km northeast of Qazan, republic's capital, by road.

The village already existed during the period of the Qazan Khanate. It forms part of the district since 1965.

There are 40 streets in the village.

References

External links 
 

Rural localities in Vysokogorsky District